Ang Christou (born 16 January 1972) is a former Australian rules footballer for Carlton in the Australian Football League.

Football career
Christou played for the Carlton Football Club and along with Anthony Koutoufides was a popular figure as a Greek Australian.

In 2001, Christou had a solid pre-season, but missed the first month of the AFL season due to a knee injury. After his return in Round 7, Christou was noted for his penetrating kicks from defence. However, he was dropped after Round 17 playing only 13 games for the season, including a recall for the finals series of 2001 (receiving limited game time).

Christou was noted for his long, accurate left foot kicks, often upwards of 60–65 metres. Whenever taking a kick, short or long, a chant from the Carlton crowd of "WOOF!" would always be heard. Christou was the second Carlton player to receive this chant, after Val Perovic (another long, left-footed defender) during the 1980s.

Statistics

|-
|- style="background-color: #EAEAEA"
! scope="row" style="text-align:center" | 1991
|style="text-align:center;"|
| 56 || 1 || 1 || 2 || 8 || 4 || 12 || 5 || 1 || 1.0 || 2.0 || 8.0 || 4.0 || 12.0 || 5.0 || 1.0 || 0
|-
! scope="row" style="text-align:center" | 1992
|style="text-align:center;"|
| 39 || 5 || 1 || 0 || 38 || 10 || 48 || 4 || 10 || 0.2 || 0.0 || 7.6 || 2.0 || 9.6 || 0.8 || 2.0 || 0
|- style="background-color: #EAEAEA"
! scope="row" style="text-align:center" | 1993
|style="text-align:center;"|
| 39 || 18 || 5 || 1 || 166 || 83 || 249 || 58 || 27 || 0.3 || 0.1 || 9.2 || 4.6 || 13.8 || 3.2 || 1.5 || 3
|-
! scope="row" style="text-align:center" | 1994
|style="text-align:center;"|
| 39 || 24 || 3 || 4 || 282 || 123 || 405 || 85 || 39 || 0.1 || 0.2 || 11.8 || 5.1 || 16.9 || 3.5 || 1.6 || 5
|- style="background-color: #EAEAEA"
|style="text-align:center;background:#afe6ba;"|1995†
|style="text-align:center;"|
| 39 || 25 || 6 || 5 || 339 || 118 || 457 || 92 || 50 || 0.2 || 0.2 || 13.6 || 4.7 || 18.3 || 3.7 || 2.0 || 7
|-
! scope="row" style="text-align:center" | 1996
|style="text-align:center;"|
| 39 || 24 || 1 || 8 || 283 || 87 || 370 || 83 || 26 || 0.0 || 0.3 || 11.8 || 3.6 || 15.4 || 3.5 || 1.1 || 3
|- style="background-color: #EAEAEA"
! scope="row" style="text-align:center" | 1997
|style="text-align:center;"|
| 39 || 8 || 0 || 0 || 99 || 31 || 130 || 30 || 14 || 0.0 || 0.0 || 12.4 || 3.9 || 16.3 || 3.8 || 1.8 || 0
|-
! scope="row" style="text-align:center" | 1998
|style="text-align:center;"|
| 39 || 0 || — || — || — || — || — || — || — || — || — || — || — || — || — || — || —
|- style="background-color: #EAEAEA"
! scope="row" style="text-align:center" | 1999
|style="text-align:center;"|
| 39 || 11 || 0 || 0 || 87 || 36 || 123 || 21 || 10 || 0.0 || 0.0 || 7.9 || 3.3 || 11.2 || 1.9 || 0.9 || 0
|-
! scope="row" style="text-align:center" | 2000
|style="text-align:center;"|
| 39 || 10 || 1 || 1 || 80 || 30 || 110 || 12 || 11 || 0.1 || 0.1 || 8.0 || 3.0 || 11.0 || 1.2 || 1.1 || 0
|- style="background-color: #EAEAEA"
! scope="row" style="text-align:center" | 2001
|style="text-align:center;"|
| 39 || 13 || 1 || 1 || 116 || 53 || 169 || 39 || 19 || 0.1 || 0.1 || 8.9 || 4.1 || 13.0 || 3.0 || 1.5 || 0
|-
! scope="row" style="text-align:center" | 2002
|style="text-align:center;"|
| 39 || 12 || 1 || 1 || 127 || 52 || 179 || 44 || 24 || 0.1 || 0.1 || 10.6 || 4.3 || 14.9 || 3.7 || 2.0 || 0
|- class="sortbottom"
! colspan=3| Career
! 151
! 20
! 23
! 1625
! 627
! 2252
! 473
! 231
! 0.1
! 0.2
! 10.8
! 4.2
! 14.9
! 3.1
! 1.5
! 18
|}

Post-football career
Christou participated in the E. J. Whitten Legends Game in 2003 and was awarded Man of the Match for his great game that night and was met with an enthused reaction from the crowd.

There was talk of Christou trying out as a punter for the National Football League in early 2003, a three-man crew from a US club (the identity of which Christou refused to reveal) spent two weeks in Melbourne putting him through a series of stringent tests however no signing resulted.

He co-owned the Souvlaki Hut restaurant in Templestowe Lower in Melbourne's north-east with former Carlton teammate Anthony Koutoufides, until its closure in early 2011.

He married his girlfriend Tammy on 14 May 2016.

References

External links

1972 births
Australian rules footballers from Victoria (Australia)
Australian people of Greek descent
Carlton Football Club players
Carlton Football Club Premiership players
All-Australians (AFL)
Living people
Victorian State of Origin players
One-time VFL/AFL Premiership players